Alessandro Fancellu (born 24 April 2000) is an Italian cyclist who currently rides for UCI ProTeam . He was promoted to the senior team after a year with their under-23 development side.

In the junior men's road race at the 2018 UCI Road World Championships, Fancellu finished over a minute and a half behind runaway winner Remco Evenepoel but managed to outsprint Alexandre Balmer to take the bronze medal. In 2020, from 1 August until the end of the year, Fancellu joined UCI WorldTeam  as a stagiaire.

Early life 
Fancellu started his sport career in association football, playing for local amateur side Oratorio Solbiate as an attacker before taking up cycling at the age of 12.

Major results 
2017
 6th Trofeo Città di Loano
2018
 3rd  Road race, UCI Junior Road World Championships
 5th Trofeo Città di Loano
 6th Trofeo Emilio Paganessi
2019
 1st  Overall Vuelta Ciclista a León
2020
 3rd Overall Tour of Antalya
2022
 6th Overall Tour de l'Avenir

References

External links 

2000 births
Living people
Italian male cyclists
Sportspeople from Como
Cyclists from the Province of Como